Ormetica pratti is a moth of the family Erebidae. It was described by Herbert Druce in 1900. It is found in Colombia.

References

Ormetica
Moths described in 1900
Arctiinae of South America